Air Marshal Sir John Moreton Nicholls,  (5 July 1926 – 17 May 2007) was a senior commander in the Royal Air Force. He had been a pilot at the end of the Second World War and also served with the United States Air Force in the Korean War.

Early life
Nicholls was educated at the Liverpool Collegiate School and St Edmund Hall, Oxford.

Career
Nicholls joined the Royal Air Force in June 1945 and served as a pilot during the later stages of the Second World War. During the Korean War he was seconded to the United States Air Force where he saw active service as a pilot and shot down a MiG 15. In 1959 he was seconded to English Electric to test fly the new supersonic Lightning. He was appointed Officer Commanding the Air Fighting Development Squadron in 1962, deputy director of Air Staff Briefing in 1965 and Station Commander at RAF Leuchars in 1967. 

Nicholls went on to be Senior Air Staff Officer at Headquarters No. 11 Group in 1971, Personal Staff Officer to the Chief of the Defence Staff in November 1971 and Senior Air Staff Officer at Headquarters RAF Strike Command in 1973. He was then made Assistant Chief of the Air Staff (Operational Requirements) in 1976, Air Member for Supply and Organisation in 1977 and Vice Chief of the Air Staff in 1979 before retiring in 1980.

Family
In 1946, Nicholls married Enid Rose; they had two daughters. Following the death of his first wife, he married Sheelagh Hall in 1977.

References

|-
 

1926 births
2007 deaths
20th-century Royal Air Force personnel
Alumni of St Edmund Hall, Oxford
Commanders of the Order of the British Empire
Knights Commander of the Order of the Bath
Military personnel from Cheshire
Recipients of the Air Force Cross (United Kingdom)
Recipients of the Distinguished Flying Cross (United Kingdom)
Royal Air Force air marshals
Royal Air Force pilots of World War II
United States Air Force personnel of the Korean War